Gergana Dimitrova is Bulgarian theatre director, playwright and translator.

Biography
Gergana Dimitrova was born in 1975 in Bourgas, graduated in Cultural Studies from the University of Sofia (2000) and in Theatre Directing from Ernst Busch Academy of Dramatic Arts in Berlin (2005) and the National Academy of Theatre & Film in Sofia (2007).

Dimitrova is a member of the new wave of Bulgarian theatre which succeeded to the one which developed during the years after the end of the communist pro-Sovietic regime in 1989. Veneta Doytcheva, a Bulgarian theatre critic, writes about this new wave:—

Dimitrova with two other theatre directors, Mladen Alexiev and Vassilena Radeva, founded in 2007 "36 Singes", a NGO "for contemporary alternative art and culture".  Each one of them keeps and expresses his personality in his own creations. As a triumvirate, they direct projects oriented towards the translation and promotion of new texts. Gergana Dimitrova is perhaps the only one among them who has directed on a big stage. Her creation of Fritz Kater's Zeit zu lieben zeit zu sterben (Time to Love Time to Die) in the Varna Dramatic Theatre impresses of its richness of thought, precise theatre language and the capacity of synthesis that emerges from this expressive universe.

Dimitrova is one of the creators of the "ProText" platform. It's a several-year program, devoted to research, promotion and the presentation of new plays, young writers and new aesthetics.

Dimitrova lives currently in Sofia.

Awards and honours
She won "Ikar" award of the Union of Bulgarian Artists in 2012 for best theatre play (for P.O. Box Unabomber co-written with Zdrava Kamenova) and "Ikar" for best director the same year (for the performance P.O. Box Unabomber).

See also 
 P.O. Box Unabomber

References

External links 
 Interview with Gergana Dimitrova for World Theatre News
 "36 monkeys" website

1975 births
Living people
Bulgarian theatre directors
Bulgarian translators
Ernst Busch Academy of Dramatic Arts alumni
Bulgarian dramatists and playwrights
Sofia University alumni